This is the list of Mayors of Nablus in chronological order.

Mayors of Nablus

 Sheikh Mohammad Tuffaha  1869-1872
 Hasan Abdul Hadi                  	1873-1874
 Dr. Ahmad Hilmi 	1874-1876
 Hasan Abdul Hadi 	1879-1885
 Sahrif Touqan 	1886-1887
 Abdellatif Abdul Hadi 	1887-1894
 Bashir Touqan 	1894-1896
 Badawi Ashour 	1896-1897
 Abdellatif Abdul Hadi 	1897-1900
 Bashir Touqan 	1901-1902
 Tawfiq Hamad 	1902-1906
 Mohammad Abdo 	1907-1908
 Abdellatif Abdul Hadi 	1908-1910
 Haidar Touqan	1911-1912
 Kamal Eddin Arafat 	1912-1913
 Yousef Tamimi 	1913-1913
 Hasan Hammad 	1913-1915
 Bashir Sharabi (Acting) 	1915-1915
 Kamal Eddin Arafat (Acting) 	1915-1916
 Ahmad Mukhtar 	1916-1917
 Yousef Tamimi 	1917-1917
 Haidar Touqak 	1917-1917
 Omar Zu'aiter 	1917-1918
 Nimer Hammad 	1918-1918
 Suleiman Smadi (Acting) 	1918-1918
 Haidar Touqak 	1918-1918
 Omar Zu'aiter 	1918-1924
 Omar Jouhari 	1924-1925
 Suleiman Touqan 	1925-1951
 Ahmad Shakaa (Acting) 	1951-1951
 Na'im Abdul Hadi 	1951-1955
 The city Governor 	1955-1957
 Ahmad Srouri 	1957-1959
 Hamdi Kan'an 	1959-1963
 Ma'zoz Masri 	1963-1976
 Bassam Shakaa 	1976-1982
 Appointed Authority 	1982-1985
 Zafer al-Masri  	1985-1986
 Hafez Touqan 	1986-1988
 Ghassan Shakaa 	1994-2004
 Local Government Committee led by Dr. Hussein Al-Araj 	2004-2005
 Local Government Committee led by Ghassan Hammouz 	2005-Dec. 2005
 Adly Yaish 	Dec. 2005 - Oct. 2012
 Ghassan Shakaa 	Oct 2012 - Aug. 2015
 Local Government Committee chaired by Sameeh Tubeila Aug. 2015 - May 2017
 Adly Yaish  May 2017 - present

External links
Mayors of Nablus
About Nablus

Nablus
 
Nablus